Cicadellinae is a leafhopper subfamily in the family Cicadellidae.

Selected genera 
 Bothrogonia
 Cicadella
 Cofana
 Graphocephala
 Homalodisca
 Zyzzogeton

References

External links 

 
Cicadellidae